Gone too Long is an album by Swedish singer Charlotte Perrelli, released on 30 June 2004. It peaked at 11th place on the Swedish music charts. The song "Long Way Home" was written by British pop group Steps, before their 2001 split.

Track listing
Gone too Long
Million Miles Away
What a Feeling
Believe in Love Again
Long Way Home
Wrapped Around
All by Myself
Where Were You
Wandering Light
Tell Me
Closer
Broken Heart

Charts

References

2004 albums
Charlotte Perrelli albums